Esther Edwards Burr (February 13, 1732 – April 7, 1758) was the mother of 3rd U.S. Vice President Aaron Burr, Jr. and the wife of Princeton University President Aaron Burr, Sr. whom she married in 1752, one year after she moved to Stockbridge in western Massachusetts. 
Her journal (which she began in October 1754) records her perspectives on her daily activities and current events; it is important in studies of American history and literature for it is an important insight into a woman's daily life in the late colonial period of the United States but it was not until 1984 that her Journal was published in its entirety to the public.

Early life and family

Esther Edwards was born in Northampton, Province of Massachusetts Bay, the third of the eleven children of Sarah (Pierpont) Edwards and the famed preacher of the Great Awakening, Jonathan Edwards. Esther was named after Edwards' mother and grandmother who came before her.  She initially grew up in the town of Northampton, but Jonathan Edwards had a falling out with the church in Northampton, the First Church of Northampton was unwilling for Jonathan Edwards to change his position on the Lord's table. This led to the Edwards family moving to the frontier settlement Stockbridge, Massachusetts in 1751, where she met Aaron Burr, Sr. whom she married in 1752. Though the Edwards children were encouraged to read the Bible and engage in piety at all times, they were not kept in the dark about all forms of contemporary, non-religious culture. For instance, they were allowed to read novels, if their parents approved of their content, but Jonathan Edwards was still a rather strict father,

Esther Edwards was never given a proper formal education, but she given quite an education at home. Both her parents were as interested in her writing ability. These writing abilities carried over to her adult life, evident in her journal, consisting of letters sent to her friend.

Esther Burr was a member of the Church at Stockbridge and Northampton and later the church in Newark.  In 1752, Esther married Aaron Burr, Sr. She was just seventeen when she received her first and only marriage proposal, Aaron Burr, Sr. was the president of the College of New Jersey (now Princeton University). In 1754 Esther had a daughter named Sarah nicknamed Sally and in 1756 she gave birth to Aaron Burr, Jr. who would become vice president of the United States (1801–05). The marriage seems to have been a happy one. Esther, however, desperately missed her friends and close-knit family. Her new husband's duties frequently kept him away from home, and Esther found her own responsibilities as the wife of a university president and prominent minister. Esther managed the affairs of the household and hosted many of the scholars of the school at her home.

Esther Burr's daughter, Sarah, married Tapping Reeve, previously Aaron jr. and Sarah's School Tutor and the founder of America's first law school Litchfield Law School.  Esther Burr's son, Aaron, was the third vice president of the United States (1801–05), who shot and killed Alexander Hamilton in a duel in 1804. Esther kept to a plain style, proudly asserting that she was a "busy housewife."

Her journal

Like the earlier journal of Sarah Kemble Knight in 1704–1705, Esther Burr's Journal provides insight into a woman's daily life in the late colonial period of the United States.  Esther Burr's Journal might be called an epistolary diary, since, rather than being a traditional diary written as a private record for oneself, Esther Burr's Journal consists of letters exchanged with her childhood friend Sarah Prince in Boston from 1754 to 1757. In the Journal, Sarah Prince is referred to as Fidelia while Sarah refers to Esther as Burrissa most likely a reference to her last name after she married Aaron Burr Sr. Esther wrote about ordinary things that happened around her, but she also sometimes expressed original thoughts about serious topics in passing such as the dominant themes of loneliness and hardship of everyday existence as well as slavery.

That there exist multiple editions of Esther Burr's Journal can be somewhat confusing. In 1901, the president of Howard University, Jeremiah Rankin, published a book which, despite being entitled Esther Burr's Journal is actually a fictionalized account of Esther's life. It was not until 1984 that Esther Burr's Journal was published in its entirety by Carol F. Karlsen and Laurie Crumpacker but this book is no longer in print and it is quite hard to find a copy in good condition.

Death
Less than a month after the sudden death of her father, Jonathan Edwards (who had come to Princeton to be Burr's successor as president of the college who died March 22, 1758, due to compilation with smallpox), Esther died on April 7, 1758, after "a few days illness". The illness turned out to be a deadly case of smallpox, and her death left her two children, Aaron and Sarah Burr, as orphans, Burr and his sister went to live with their wealthy maternal uncle Timothy Edwards in a cramped, crowded environment. Aaron Burr, Sr. had died previously in September 1757. Sarah Edwards, her mother, died soon after in October 1758 Esther, along with the rest of the Edwards family, where buried together at the Bridge Street Cemetery in Northampton.

After Esther's death in Princeton, on April 7, 1758. Sarah Prince was nearly inconsolable. "My whole dependance for Comfort in this World [is] gone," Sarah wrote in her personal book of meditations. "[Esther] was dear to me as the Apple of my Eye- she knew and felt all my griefs..."

In popular culture

Theatre and film 

Aaron Burr Jr. is featured in the hit Broadway show "Hamilton", played by Leslie Odom Jr., Aaron Burr mentions Esther twice in the first half of the musical. Esther is personified by a female ensemble member during "Wait For It" after Leslie Odom Jr. playing the role of Aaron Burr Jr. sings the line "My Mother was a genius" and then proceeds to sing, "when they (Esther Edwards Burr and Aaron Burr Sr.) died they left no instructions, just a legacy to protect", implying that they didn't tell Aaron Burr Jr. anything before she died, Esther is briefly also mentioned in "Aaron Burr, Sir".

References

Colonial American women
American diarists
Women diarists
People of colonial Massachusetts
People of colonial New Jersey
1732 births
1758 deaths
Esther Edwards
Jonathan Edwards family
American people of English descent
Mothers of vice presidents of the United States
18th-century diarists